Irving Leonard Finkel (born 1951) is a British philologist and Assyriologist. He is the Assistant Keeper of Ancient Mesopotamian script, languages and cultures in the Department of the Middle East in the British Museum, where he specialises in cuneiform inscriptions on tablets of clay from ancient Mesopotamia.

Early life and education
Finkel was born in 1951 to a dentist father and teacher mother, one of five children (including a sister named Angela), and grew up at Palmers Green, North London. He was raised as an Orthodox Jew but became an atheist as a teenager. He earned a PhD in Assyriology from the University of Birmingham under the supervision of Wilfred G. Lambert with a dissertation on Babylonian exorcistic spells against demons.

Career

Philology
Finkel spent three years as a Research Fellow at the University of Chicago Oriental Institute. In 1976 he returned to the UK, and he was appointed as Assistant Keeper in the Department of Western Asiatic Antiquities at the British Museum, where he was (and remains) responsible for curating, reading and translating the museum's collection of around 130,000 cuneiform tablets.

In 2014, Finkel's study of a cuneiform tablet that contained a Flood narrative similar to that of the story of Noah's Ark, described in his book The Ark Before Noah, was widely reported in the news media. The ark described in the tablet was circular, essentially a very large coracle or kuphar and made of rope on a wooden frame. The tablet included sufficient details of its dimensions and construction to enable a copy of the ark to be made at about 1/3 scale and successfully floated, as documented in a 2014 TV documentary Secrets of Noah's Ark that aired as an episode of PBS's NOVA series.

Board games
Finkel studies the history of board games, and is on the Editorial Board of Board Game Studies. Among his breakthrough works is the determination of the rules of the Royal Game of Ur. He also owns a replica set of the Lewis chessmen which were used as props in the first Harry Potter film.

Great Diary Project
Finkel founded the Great Diary Project, a project to preserve the diaries of ordinary people. In association with the Bishopsgate Institute, Finkel has helped to archive over 2,000 personal diaries. In 2014, the V&A Museum of Childhood held an exhibition of the diaries of children written between 1813 and 1996.

Literary
Finkel has written a number of works of fiction for children.

He appeared in the 2014 memoir The Boy in the Book by Nathan Penlington.

Personal life
Finkel lives in southeast London with his wife Joanna and has five children.

Selected publications

Academic

Fiction

References

External links
.
.
.
The Great Diary Project
Meeting Irving Finkel. The Jager File, 24 September 2010. Retrieved 15 April 2013. Archived here.

1951 births
Alumni of the University of Birmingham
British archaeologists
English Assyriologists
British Jewish writers
Jewish atheists
Employees of the British Museum
Living people
Tabletop game writers
British philologists
Jewish scholars
20th-century archaeologists
21st-century archaeologists
Assyriologists